Mostafa Khomeini (12 December 1930 – 23 October 1977) was an Iranian cleric and the eldest son of Ayatollah Khomeini. He died before the Iranian Revolution.

Early life and education
Khomeini was born in Qom on 12 December 1930. He was the eldest son of Ayatollah Khomeini and Khadijeh Saqafi, daughter of a respected cleric, Hajj Mirza Tehrani.

He graduated from the Qom Theological Center.

Activities
Khomeini participated in his father's movement. He was arrested and imprisoned after the 1963 events and also, after his father's exile. On 3 January 1965, he joined his father in Bursa, Turkey, where he was in exile. Then he lived with his family in Najaf, Iraq. He and his brother Ahmad became part of Khomeini's underground movement. The group also included Mohammad Beheshti and Morteza Motahhari.

Personal life and death
Khomeini married Masoumeh Haeri Yazdi, a daughter of Morteza Haeri Yazdi. Khomeini died of a heart attack in Najaf on 23 October 1977. His father, Ayatollah Khomeini, did not attend the funeral. He was buried in Najaf within the shrine of Imam Ali. 

His death has been regarded as suspicious by both the followers of Ayatollah Khomeini and common people of Iran due to his death being announced while he was in police custody and various reports that SAVAK agents were present at the scene. Hence, his death was attributed to the Shah's secret police, SAVAK. His father later described Mostafa's death as a "martyrdom" and one of the "hidden favours" of God since it fueled the growing discontent with the Shah which finally produced Iranian Revolution just slightly over one year after Mostafa's death.

References

External link

20th-century Iranian people
1930 births
1977 deaths
Al-Moussawi family
Children of national leaders
Iranian emigrants to Iraq
Iranian emigrants to Turkey
Iranian exiles
Iranian Shia clerics
People from Qom
Ruhollah Khomeini